The C Spire Conerly Trophy is an award given annually to the best college football player in the state of Mississippi by the Mississippi Sports Hall of Fame.

Voting
Sixty media representatives from across Mississippi determine the Trophy recipient. All players at Mississippi's four-year college football programs are eligible on the first ballot. Previously, the top three vote-getters were listed on a second and final ballot, but starting with the 2011 award, each of the four-year colleges and universities in Mississippi that field football teams are represented by one finalist. In 2013, fans were allowed to vote on the award for the first time.  Fan voting accounted for 10 percent of the total vote.

Voters are instructed to evaluate a player's entire regular season performance and ignore post-season honors or professional potential.

The trophy
The Conerly Trophy is a bronze casting, 19" high x 11" long x 7.5" wide, weighing 18.5 lbs. (8.4 kg). The trophy was sculpted by Bruce Holmes Brady, a Brookhaven, Mississippi native and graduate of the University of Mississippi. The original trophy is on permanent display at the Mississippi Sports Hall of Fame and Museum. A replica of the trophy is presented to the winner each year at the announcement dinner.

History
The award was begun in 1996 and has been sponsored by C Spire Wireless, formerly known as Cellular South, since 1998. Previous presentations have been held in Jackson, Clarksdale, Tunica and Biloxi.  The namesake of the award is Mississippi-born Charlie Conerly who also starred as quarterback at the University of Mississippi, and was later a star for the New York Giants.

Winners and finalists

Kent Hull Trophy
Starting in 2013, the Mississippi Sports Hall of Fame began awarding a second award, the Kent Hull Trophy, for the best college offensive lineman in Mississippi.

Trophies won by school

See also
Howell Trophy - award given annually to the best men's college basketball player in the state of Mississippi by the Mississippi Sports Hall of Fame.
Gillom Trophy - award given annually to the best women's college basketball player in the state of Mississippi by the Mississippi Sports Hall of Fame.
C Spire Ferriss Trophy - award given annually to the best men's college baseball player in the state of Mississippi by the Mississippi Sports Hall of Fame.

References

External links
Past Conerly Winners
College Football Awards: All National and Conference Winners Through 2010

College football regional and state awards
Awards established in 1996
American football in Mississippi